Banuelia Mrashani-Katesigwa (born 14 November 1977) is a Tanzanian long-distance runner. She competed in the women's marathon at the 2004 Summer Olympics.

References

External links
 

1977 births
Living people
Athletes (track and field) at the 2004 Summer Olympics
Tanzanian female long-distance runners
Tanzanian female marathon runners
Olympic athletes of Tanzania
Place of birth missing (living people)